Polwarth  may refer to:

Polwarth (sheep), a breed of sheep
Polwarth, Edinburgh
Polwarth, Scottish Borders
Patrick Hume of Polwarth, makar in the court of James VI of Scotland
Electoral district of Polwarth in the Parliament of Victoria, Australia
County of Polwarth, a county of Victoria, Australia.